Centerville is an unincorporated community in Wayne County, in the U.S. state of Ohio.

History
Centerville was platted in 1851. A former variant name was Special.

References

Unincorporated communities in Wayne County, Ohio
Unincorporated communities in Ohio